Possible meanings:

 Task Force Europe
 Terraform_(software), Terraform Enterprise (TFE) is the self-hosted distribution of Terraform Cloud
 Tetrafluoroethylene, a chemical compound
 Teaching Foundations Exam
 The Fifth Element (Le Cinquième Élément), a French film by Luc Besson
 The Final Experiment, also known as Ayreon: The Final Experiment, a rock opera by Arjen A. Lucassen
 The Forest's Edge, a MUD game
 TheFutureEmbrace, a music album by Billy Corgan
 Thin Film Equipment
 Transport for Edinburgh, a public transport organisation
 Trifluoroethanol, a chemical compound
 Serious Sam: The First Encounter, a video game, often shortened to Serious Sam: TFE
 Technical Feasibility Exceptions, a NERC-CIP compliance exception based upon technical infeasibility
 Tax-free equivalent. United States municipal bonds are tax-free; the tax-free equivalent % equates such a bond to a taxed corporate bond.